Curia regis is a Latin term meaning "royal council" or "king's court". It was the name given to councils of advisers and administrators in medieval Europe who served kings, including kings of France, Norman kings of England and Sicily, kings of Poland and the kings and queens of Scotland.

England

Before the Conquest, the Anglo-Saxons called this body the witan, and English writers continued to use this term as well.

The  conducted the business of state whether legislative, judicial, or diplomatic. Its membership was the tenants-in-chief (i.e. the baronage, including bishops and abbots) along with the great officers of state and of the royal household, such as the chancellor, constable, treasurer or chamberlain, marshal, and steward.

In between great councils, the  remained in session; though, its membership was much smaller. The smaller curia was composed of royal officers and barons attending the monarch. English kings had itinerant courts during this period, and the small curia followed the king in all his travels. As they traveled the kingdom, the king and curia often heard suitors in person. The powers and functions of the great council and the small curia were identical since they were considered the same institution meeting under different circumstances.

During the 13th century, the great council and the small curia separated into two distinct bodies. The great council evolved into Parliament and the small curia evolved into the Privy Council. The small  then is "the very distant ancestor of the modern executive, the Cabinet acting for the authority of the crown." Early government departments also developed out of the small curia regis, such as the chancery, the treasury, and the exchequer.

France 

In France the King's Court, called the Curia Regis in Latin, functioned as an advisory body under the early Capetian kings. It was composed of a number of the king's trusted advisers but only a few travelled with the king at any time. By the later twelfth century it had become a judicial body with a few branching off to remain the king's council.

By the fourteenth century the term curia regis was no longer used. However, it was a predecessor to later sovereign assemblies: the Parlement, which was a judiciary body, the Chamber of Accounts, which was a financial body, and the King's Council.

Poland
The   in early medieval times was composed exclusively by King's will. Over time,  in addition to King's appointments, certain higher dignitaries were assumed to belong to the Council owing to their functions. The following dignitaries were permanent members of the Council in the Crown of the Kingdom of Poland:

 

 
 

Certain ecclesiastical dignitaries

By the end of the 15th century the Royal Council was transformed into the Senate of Poland.

See also 
 Court of King's Bench (England)

References

Bibliography

Further reading
 
 
 

11th century in politics
12th century in politics
13th century in politics
Latin political words and phrases
1060s establishments in England
Royal and noble courts
Political history of medieval England